Chari Towne (born July 26, 1960) is an American rower. She competed in the women's coxless pair event at the 1984 Summer Olympics.

References

External links
 

1960 births
Living people
American female rowers
Olympic rowers of the United States
Rowers at the 1984 Summer Olympics
People from Wild Rose, Wisconsin
21st-century American women